Kevin Santos may refer to:

 Kevin Santos (actor), Filipino actor
 Kévin Santos, Portuguese footballer

It may also refer to:
 Kevin Santos Lopes de Macedo, Brazilian footballer known as Kevin
 Kevin Santos Silva, American soccer player known as Kevin Silva